T. Yangseo Sangtam is an Indian politician who served as Deputy Speaker of Nagaland Legislative Assembly from 2022-2023 and Member of Nagaland Legislative Assembly from Pungro Kiphire Assembly constituency.

References 

Living people
Nagaland MLAs 2018–2023
People from Kiphire district
Year of birth missing (living people)
Deputy Speakers of the Nagaland Legislative Assembly
Independent politicians in India
Republican Party of India (Athawale) politicians